St-Jacques is a surname, and may refer to:

 Diane St-Jacques (born 1953), Canadian politician
 Guillaume Cheval dit St-Jacques (1828-1880), Quebec businessman and political figure

See also

 Saint-Jacques (disambiguation)
 St. Jacques (disambiguation)